The Soviet national youth football team was the under-21 football team of the Soviet Union. Before 1978 it was known as under-23 team. It ceased to exist on the breakup of the Union.

Following the realignment of UEFA's youth competitions in 1976, the USSR Under-21 team was formed.  The team had a good record, winning the competition twice, reaching the last four once, but failing to qualify for the last eight on five occasions. 

After the dissolution of the USSR (on 26 December 1991), the senior team played out its remaining fixtures, which were the finals of Euro 92. Because the USSR U-21s had, by 26 December, already failed to qualify for their version of the 1992 European Championship, the former Soviet states didn't play as a combined team at U-21 level ever again.  

Of the former Soviet states, only Russia entered the 1992–1994 competition. A total of 15 former Soviet states play international football today; 11 in Europe under UEFA, 4 in Asia under the AFC.

Since the under-21 competition rules insist that players must be 21 or under at the start of a two-year competition, technically it is an U-23 competition.  USSR's unparalleled record in U-23 competitions is also shown.

UEFA U-23 championship record 
Started in Balkans as the Under-23 Challenge Cup which ran from 1967 to 1970, the Soviet Union did not participate.

UEFA U-21 championship record

Managers

 1963  Boris Nabokov
 1964  Boris Nabokov and  Vasiliy Sokolov
 1964  Vasiliy Sokolov
 1965  Yevgeniy Goryanskiy
 1965  Gavriil Kachalin
 1966  Viktor Lakhonin and  Yevgeniy Rogov
 1966  Nikita Simonyan
 1967  Boris Nabokov

 1967  German Zonin
 1967  Vsevolod Blinkov
 1968  Gavriil Kachalin and  Aleksei Paramonov
 1968  Gavriil Kachalin
 1968  Vitaliy Artemyev
 1969–1973  Boris Nabokov
 1974–1976  Valentin Nikolayev
 1976  Sergei Mosiagin

 1977–1979  Valentin Nikolayev
 1980  Valentin Nikolayev and  Sergei Korshunov
 1980–1985  Valentin Nikolayev
 1985  Vladimir Salkov
 1985  Eduard Malofeyev
 1986–1990  Vladimir Radionov
 1988  Leonid Pakhomov
 1991–1992  Boris Ignatyev

 In 1992 it also competed as the CIS national under-21 football team coached by Boris Ignatyev. Since August of 1992 Boris Ignatyev continued already with the Russia national under-21 football team.

1990 European Championship squad
The last Soviet U-21 team
Head coach Vladimir Radionov

Notes:
 All data through 31 December 1991.
 Mikhail Yeremin died on 30 June 1991 from injuries he sustained in an auto accident on 23 June, less than a week after his birthday.
 Rogovskoi moved to Poland (Zagłębie Lubin), Sydelnykov - Germany (SG Wattenscheid 09), Pozdnyakov - Austria (FC Stahl Linz), Tskhadadze - Sweden (GIF Sundsvall), Shalimov - Italy (U.S. Foggia), Kanchelskis - England (Manchester United F.C.), Pyatnitskiy - Russia (Spartak Moscow), Mostovoi - Portugal (S.L. Benfica), Dobrovolskiy - Switzerland (Servette FC), Kolyvanov - Italy (U.S. Foggia), Yuran - Portugal (S.L. Benfica).

National teams of the former Soviet republics

See also 
 European Under-21 Football Championship

External links
 UEFA Under-21 website Contains full results archive
 The Rec.Sport.Soccer Statistics Foundation Contains full record of U-21/U-23 Championships.
 НЕОФИЦИАЛЬНЫЙ РЕЕСТР МАТЧЕЙ МОЛОДЕЖНОЙ СБОРНОЙРОССИИ /СССР, СНГ/. www.rusteam.permian.ru

1963 establishments in the Soviet Union
1991 disestablishments in the Soviet Union
European national under-21 association football teams
Soviet Union national football team
Youth football in the Soviet Union